Azoth was considered to be a universal medication or universal solvent, and was sought for in alchemy. Similar to another alchemical idealized substance, alkahest, azoth was the aim, goal and vision of many alchemical works. Its symbol was the Caduceus. The term, while originally a term for an occult formula sought by alchemists much like the philosopher's stone, became a poetic word for the element mercury. The name is Medieval Latin, an alteration of azoc, being originally derived from the Arabic al-zā'būq "the mercury," even if it is a common misconception of the era to link azoth as mercury alone rather than the addition of mercury, salt and sulfur when it comes to the senses and symbols.

Basis
Azoth was believed to be the essential agent of transformation in alchemy. It is the name given by ancient alchemists to mercury, the animating spirit hidden in all matter that makes transmutation possible. The word occurs in the writings of many early alchemists, such as Zosimos, Mary the Jewess, Olympiodorus, and Jābir ibn Hayyān (Geber).

In texts
The Azoth is related to the Ain Soph (ultimate substance) of the Kabbalah. In his book The Secret Teachings of All Ages Manly P. Hall explained this connection:

The universe is surrounded by the sphere of light or stars. Beyond that sphere is Schamayim (שמים), the Hebrew word for 'heaven', who is the Divine Fiery Water, the first outflow of the Word of God, the flaming river pouring from the presence of the eternal mind. Schamayim, who is this fiery Androgyne, divides. His Fire becomes Solar fire and his Water becomes Lunar water in our universe. Schamayim is the Universal Mercury or Azoth—the measureless spirit of life. That original spiritual fiery water comes through Edem ("vapor" in Hebrew) and pours itself into the four main rivers of the four Elements. This comprises the River of Living Water—the Azoth—or fiery mercurial essence, that flows out from the throne of God and Lamb. In this Edem (vaporous essence or mist) is the first or spiritual Earth, the incomprehensible and intangible dust out of which God formed Adam Kadmon, the spiritual body of man, which must become fully revealed through time.

In his book Transcendental Magic, Eliphas Levi wrote:

The Azoth or Universal Medicine is, for the soul, supreme reason and absolute justice; for the mind, it is mathematical and practical truth; for the body it is the quintessence, which is a combination of gold and light. In the superior or spiritual world, it is the First Matter of the Great Work, the source of the enthusiasm and activity of the alchemist. In the intermediate or mental world, it is intelligence and industry. In the inferior or material world, it is physical labor. Sulfur, Mercury, and Salt, which, volatilized and fixed alternately, compose the Azoth of the sages. Sulfur corresponds to the elementary form of Fire, Mercury to Air and Water, Salt to Earth.

Life and the universe

Believed to be the Universal Solvent, Universal Cure, and Elixir of Life (elixir vitae), the Azoth is said to embody all medicines, as well as the first principles of all other substances. In late-16th-century Paracelsianism,  Paracelsus (d. 1541) was said to have achieved the Azoth, and in the "Rosicrucian" portrait of 1567 the pommel of his sword bears the inscription Azoth.
The first part of the pseudo-Paracelsian Archidoxis magica (first printed in 1591) bears the title Liber Azoth, containing various magic sigils and recipes intended to protect against illnesses and injuries.

The Azoth is believed to be the animating energy (spiritus animatus) of the body, and the inspiration and enthusiasm that moves the mind. The Azoth is believed to be the mysterious evolutionary force responsible for the drive towards physical and spiritual perfection. Thus, the concept of the Azoth is analogous to the light of nature or mind of God.

Because the Azoth is believed to contain the complete information of the whole universe, it is also used as another word for the Philosopher's Stone. One of the hints for the theoretical preparation of the Stone is Ignis et Azoth tibi sufficiunt ("Fire and Azoth are sufficient"). There are scores of esoteric drawings depicting the Azoth and how it is used in the Great Work of alchemy. Examples include the Azoth of the Philosophers by Basil Valentine and the Hieroglyphic Monad of Dr. John Dee.

The term was considered by occultist Aleister Crowley to represent a unity of beginning and ending by tying together the first and last letters of the alphabets of antiquity; A/𐤀 (Aleph, the first character in the Phoenician alphabet), Z (Zeta, the final character in Latin), O/Ω (Omega, the final character in Greek) and Th/ת (Tav, pronounced "Tau", the final character in Hebrew). In this way permeation and totality of beginning and end symbolized the supreme wholeness and the universal synthesis of opposites as a 'cancellation' (i.e. solvent) or 'cohesion' (i.e. medicine), and in such a way is believed to be similar to the philosophical "absolute" of Hegel's dialectic. Crowley further made reference in his works referring to Azoth as "the fluid", calling it the universal solvent or universal medicine of the medieval alchemical philosophers, as a unifier or unification of a certain extreme instance beholden to a contradict, irreconcilable nature if otherwise sought apart of the philosophical ideal of Azoth.

See also
Anima mundi
Panacea (medicine)
Prima materia
Viriditas

References

External links

 Interpretation of Azoth of the Philosophers (by Dennis William Hauck)
 What is the Azoth? and The Azoth Ritual at azothalchemy.org

Alchemical substances
Mythological medicines and drugs